Baduizm is the debut studio album by American singer-songwriter Erykah Badu. It was released on February 11, 1997, by Kedar Records and Universal Records. After leaving university in order to concentrate on music full-time, Badu then began touring with her cousin, Robert "Free" Bradford, and recorded a 19-song demo, Country Cousins, which attracted the attention of Kedar Massenburg. He set Badu up to record a duet with D'Angelo, "Your Precious Love," and eventually signed her to a record deal with Universal. Recording sessions for the album took place from January to October 1996 in New York City, Philadelphia, and Dallas.

Baduizm was met with positive reviews from music critics who praised the album's musical style and Badu's artistic vision; other critics noted similarities between Badu and Billie Holiday. Baduizm was a commercial success debuting at number two on the US Billboard charts and number one on the Billboard Top R&B/Hip-Hop Albums. The album was certified three times platinum by Recording Industry Association of America, Gold by British Phonographic Industry and Gold by the Canadian Recording Industry Association.

Baduizm was promoted with the release of four singles: "On & On", "Next Lifetime", "Otherside of the Game", and "Appletree". The album received many accolades, including the Grammy Award for Best R&B Album at the 40th Grammy Awards. Along with fellow contemporary albums such as D'Angelo's Brown Sugar (1995) and Maxwell's Urban Hang Suite (1996), Baduizm success helped establish Badu as one of the leading artists in the neo-soul genre and is one of the albums credited with contributing to the genre's commercial visibility at the time.

Background and recording

To focus on music full time Badu dropped out from Grambling State University. Badu then began working and touring with her cousin, Robert "Free" Bradford, during this period she recorded a 19-song demo, Country Cousins, which attracted the attention of Kedar Massenburg. Massenburg set a recording session up with D'Angelo to record, "Your Precious Love," and eventually signed her to a record deal with Universal Records.
Badu was partly influenced by Brandy's debut album, notably "I Wanna Be Down" and "Always on My Mind". Badu also took inspiration from her ancestry particularly turbans and African drums.

Recording sessions started in January through to October 1996 at Battery Studios in New York City, Sigma Sounds & Ivory Studios in Philadelphia, and Dallas Sound Lab in Dallas. Badu provided lead and background vocals, along with keyboards, drum machine and other music programming on the album with the help of Madukwu,  N'Dambi, Bob Power, Ike Lee III, and Ron Carter. Shortly before the albums release, Badu grew unhappy with the recorded material and travelled back to Philadelphia to work with the Roots. The sessions led to the demo's "Otherside of the Game" and "Sometimes" being included on Baduizm.

Critical reception

Baduizm established Badu as a popular artist and received positive reviews from critics, who viewed the record as a return to the simplicity of early '70s soul. Vibe magazine's Karen R. Good called the record "a conduit of awakening of something dark, familiar and long slept," while John Bush from AllMusic felt it was innovative primarily for its sound, "heavier hip-hop beats over organic, conscientious soul music."

Badu's particular style of singing drew many comparisons to Billie Holiday. Entertainment Weekly said Badu echoed Holiday in "her phrasing and cadence," while Greg Kot from the Chicago Tribune commented: "Rather than merely mimicking Holiday, Badu offers a canny update of the socially conscious soul of the early '70s with her mid-tempo grooves and sultry, conversational vocals." In the Los Angeles Times, Robert Hilburn wrote: "Freely mixing musical eras and inspirations (Billie Holiday to Stevie Wonder, jazz to hip-hop), Badu combines supper-club sophistication with an artistic vision as unique and independent" as Prince in the '80s. Writing for Rolling Stone, Miles Marshall Lewis stated: "Baduizm showcases the heart and soul of a bohemian B-girl who happens to have an effortless jazz swing."

At the end of 1997, Baduizm was voted the seventh best record of the year in the Pazz & Jop, an annual poll of American critics published by The Village Voice. Robert Christgau, the poll's supervisor, was less enthusiastic and dismissed the comparisons to Billie Holiday, deeming Badu "a mite too bourgie-boho" for his tastes.

Release and sales
After Baduizm was released, it peaked at number two on the Billboard 200 and number one on the Top R&B/Hip-Hop Albums. The album's success helped establish Badu as one of the leading artists in the flourishing neo-soul genre. Baduizm was certified three times platinum by the Recording Industry Association of America, Gold by the British Phonographic Industry and the Canadian Recording Industry Association. As of February 2017 the album has sold 2.8 million copies in United States.

The album produced four singles; the lead single "On & On" was released in December 1996, and reached number 12 on the US Billboard Hot 100 charts and the UK Singles Charts, as well as making an appearance on the New Zealand charts.

Accolades

In 1997, Badu received six nominations and won three: Favorite Female Solo Single for "On & On", Favorite Female Solo Album for Baduizm and Best R&B/Soul or Rap Song of the Year for "On & On" at the Soul Train Lady of Soul Awards.
In 1998, Badu received fourteen nominations and won eight, including Favorite R&B/Soul or Rap New Artist at the American Music Awards; Best Female R&B Vocal Performance for "On & On" and Best R&B Album for Baduizm at the Grammy Awards; Outstanding New Artist and Outstanding Female Artist at the NAACP Image Awards; Favorite Female Soul/R&B Single for "On & On", Favorite Female Soul/R&B Album for Baduizm and Favorite New R&B/Soul or Rap New Artist for "On & On" at the Soul Train Music Awards.

Baduizm is listed as one of the 261 greatest albums since punk and disco (the year 1976), in the music critic Garry Mulholland's book Fear of Music. 'This record works as seduction soundtrack, Saturday night chill-out, Sunday morning church replacement. The success of Erykah Badu's masterpiece briefly threatened to inspire a new era in conscious soul. But only Lauryn Hill and D'Angelo were at her level. Baduizm stands alone, a missing link between '70s street funk, basement jazz, bohemian hip hop and the blues reinventions of Portishead."

In the 2020 reboot of their list of "The 500 Greatest Albums of All Time", Rolling Stone ranked Baduizm number 89.

Track listing

Sample credits

 "Appletree" interpolates "On & On".
 “4 Leaf Clover” covers “Touch A Four Leaf Clover” by Atlantic Starr.
 "No Love" samples "Lucky Fellow" by Leroy Hutson & interpolates "I Love You Too Much" by Stevie Wonder.
 "Drama" interpolates "Pastime Paradise" by Stevie Wonder.
 "Sometimes" samples "I Feel Like Loving You Today" by Donald Byrd and 125th St, NYC.
 "Certainly (Flipped It)" samples "Summer Madness" by Kool & The Gang"

Personnel
Musicians
 Erykah Badu – keyboards (track 3), lead vocals (all tracks), background vocals (tracks 2-6, 8-9, 11)
 Ron Carter – bass (track 11)
 Madukwu Chinwah – additional voices (track 13)
 Ike Lee III – keyboards (track 3, track 9; additional on track 10)
 N'Dambi – additional voices (track 13)
 Bob Power – guitar (track 11), keyboards (11), multiple instruments (2)
 Tone The Backbone – multiple instruments (track 6)

Production
 Producers: Erykah Badu (tracks 3, 7, 9), Jaifar Barron (7), Robert Bradford (10), Madukwu Chinwah (1, 8, 13-14), Jamal "Jaborn Jamal" Cantero (2), Ike Lee III (3,9), Richard Nichols (4-5, 12), Bob Power (2, 11), James Poyser (5, 7, 12), The Roots (4-5, 12), Tone The Backbone (6)
 Executive producer: Kedar Massenburg
 Recording engineers: Lee Anthony (track 11), Tim Donovan (Additional on 2), Michael Gilbert (1, 3, 6–7, 9–10, 13–14), David Ivory (4-5, 7, 12), Anthony Lee, Bob Power (2, 11), Frank Salazar (8, 10), Chris Trevett (1, 6, 8, 14)
 Assistant engineers: Paul Shatraw (track 13), Sharon Kearney (11), Charles McCrorey (1-2, 6–9, 11, 14), John Meredith (1, 3, 10, 14)
 Mixing: Ken "Duro" Ifill (tracks 1, 7, 10, 13–14), Tim Latham (3-6, 8–9, 12), Bob Powers (2, 11)
 Mixing assistants: Martin Czembor (tracks 1, 3, 5–7, 9–10, 12–14), Tim Donovan (2, 11), Paul Shatraw (4-6, 8, 12)
 Music Programming: Erykah Badu (track 3), Ike Lee III (3,9), Bob Power (2), Tone The Backbone (6)
 Additional Drum Machines: Erykah Badu (track 10), John Meredith (10)
 Art direction: Sandie Lee Drake
 Design: Susan Bibeau
 Photography: Marc Baptiste
 Stylist: Andrew Dosunmu

Charts

Weekly charts

Year-end charts

Certifications

Awards
Grammy Awards

See also
 List of Billboard number-one R&B albums of 1997

References

External links
 Baduizm at Discogs
 Baduizm at Acclaimed Music
 Album Review at Time
 Soul Sister: Erykah Badu – By Spin

1997 debut albums
Erykah Badu albums
Grammy Award for Best R&B Album
Kedar Records albums